is a Japanese footballer currently studying at the Meiji University

Career statistics

Club
.

Notes

References

External links

2002 births
Living people
Meiji University alumni
Japanese footballers
Association football goalkeepers
J3 League players
Cerezo Osaka players
Cerezo Osaka U-23 players